The Eternal Moment and Other Stories is the title of a collection of short stories by E. M. Forster, first published in 1928 by Sidgwick & Jackson. It contains stories written between about 1903 and 1914. Together with the stories contained in The Celestial Omnibus (1911), it was collected as Forster's Collected Short Stories in 1947.  Many of these stories deal with science fiction or supernatural themes.

Includes:
 "The Machine Stops"
 "The Point of It"
 "Mr. Andrews"
 "Co-ordination"
 "The Story of the Siren"
 "The Eternal Moment"

References

External links

1928 short story collections
1928 short stories
Short story collections by E. M. Forster
Fantasy short story collections
Sidgwick & Jackson books